Masoala is a village in Madagascar, in the Antalaha District of the Sava Region of the Antsiranana Province, on the South coast of the Masoala Peninsula.

See also
Masoala National Park

Populated places in Sava Region